is a Buddhist temple in the city of Shimotsuke, Tochigi, Japan, belonging to the Shingon-shu Buzan-ha sect, and is the  provincial temple ("kokubunji") of former Shimotsuke Province. The present temple is of uncertain foundation, but claims to be the direct descendant of the original Nara period kokubunji temple which fell into ruins sometime in the Kamakura period. The Nara-period temple ruins were designated a National Historic Site in 1921, and the area under protection was expanded in 2005.

Overview
The Shoku Nihongi records that in 741 AD, as the country recovered from a major smallpox epidemic, Emperor Shōmu ordered that a state-subsidized monastery and nunnery be established in every province for the promotion of Buddhism and to enhance political unification per the new ritsuryō system. The temples were constructed per a more-or-less standardized template, and were each to be staffed by twenty clerics who would pray for the state's protection. The associated provincial nunneries (kokubunniji) were on a smaller scale, each housing ten nuns to pray for the atonement of sins. This system declined when the capital was moved from Nara to Kyoto in 794 AD.

Shimotsuke Kokubun-ji
The Shimotsuke Kokubun-ji was located on a fluvial terrace on the left bank of the Omoi River. On the opposing bank was the site of Shimotsuke Provincial Capital and the Shimotsuke Kokubun-niji, and about 7 kilometers to the northeast was the Shimotsuke Yakushi-ji. The surrounding area is also rich in Kofun period remains, including the Azuma Kofun, Biwazuka Kofun and Marishitenzuka Kofun.

The original design of the temple was an area 457 meters north-south by 413 meters east-west, surrounded by an earthen wall. Per archaeological excavations conducted from 1982, the layout and extent of the temple was confirmed. The temple follows the standardized template with a large South Gate,  Middle Gate, Kondō, Lecture Hall, Cloisters, Rectory and seven-story Pagoda, Kyōzō, Shōrō, Kuri, and dormitory. 

The temple was reconstructed three times after its completion around 741 AD. The first time was at the end of the 8th century to early 9th century. The second time was at the end of the 9th century, when the scale of the temple was reduced, and its outer clay wall abandoned in favor of a moat with a wooden palisade. The third time was at the end of the 10th century, when the buildings were repaired rather than completely rebuilt, and the moat was filled in. The temple disappeared from history sometime in 11th to 12th century.

Artifacts found during excavations are stored and displayed at the a museum on site. The ruins are about five minutes by car from Koganei Station on the JR East Tōhoku Main Line.

Shimotsuke Kokubun-niji
The temple occupied a trapezoidal layout, with an east-west dimension of 270 meters, and a north-south dimension of 145 meters on its long sides, and 211 meters and 52 meters on its short side. The layout of the temple was almost identical to that of the Shimotsuke Kokubun-ji, but on a correspondingly smaller scale and without a pagoda. An excavation survey was carried out in 1964, and this was the first example of a comprehensive survey of the remains of a provincial nunnery in Japan. This led to its designation as a National Historic Site in 1965. The nunnery fell into ruin in the Heian period and was never rebuilt.

See also
Provincial temple
List of Historic Sites of Japan (Tochigi)

References

External links

Tochigi Prefectural Tourist Information 
Shimotsuke City home page 

Buddhist temples in Tochigi Prefecture
Nara period
Shimotsuke, Tochigi
History of Tochigi Prefecture
Historic Sites of Japan
Shimotsuke Province
8th-century establishments in Japan
8th-century Buddhist temples
Buddhist archaeological sites in Japan